Renicola is a genus of flatworms belonging to the family Renicolidae.

The genus has almost cosmopolitan distribution.

Species:

Renicola aegyptiacus 
Renicola ardeolae 
Renicola brantae 
Renicola bretensis 
Renicola brevipyga 
Renicola brevivitellata 
Renicola buchanani 
Renicola caudescens 
Renicola cerithidicola 
Renicola cruzi 
Renicola dollfusi 
Renicola fischeri 
Renicola foliata 
Renicola fulmari 
Renicola glacialis 
Renicola glandoloba 
Renicola glandoloboides 
Renicola goliath 
Renicola heroni 
Renicola indicola 
Renicola keimahuri 
Renicola lari 
Renicola macedoniense 
Renicola macedoniensis 
Renicola mediovitellata 
Renicola mirandaribeiroi 
Renicola mollissima 
Renicola murmanica 
Renicola nana 
Renicola ovocallosa 
Renicola pandioni 
Renicola paraquinta 
Renicola pelecani 
Renicola philippinensis 
Renicola pinguis 
Renicola pollaris 
Renicola pseudosloanei 
Renicola quinta 
Renicola rombipharyx 
Renicola roscovitus 
Renicola secunda 
Renicola sloanei 
Renicola somateriae 
Renicola sudaricovi 
Renicola sudarikovi 
Renicola tertia 
Renicola thaidus 
Renicola thapari 
Renicola umigarasu 
Renicola undecima 
Renicola ussuriensis 
Renicola vietnamensis 
Renicola vladika 
Renicola williamsi 
Renicola wrighti

References

Platyhelminthes